The Golden Seal is a 1983 American drama film directed by Frank Zuniga and starring Steve Railsback, Michael Beck, Penelope Milford and Torquil Campbell.  It is based on James Vance Marshall’s 1962 novel A River Ran Out of Eden.

Cast
Steve Railsback as Jim Lee
Michael Beck as Crawford
Penelope Milford as Tania Lee
Torquil Campbell as Eric Lee
Seth Sakai as Semeyon
Richard Narita as Alexei
Sandra Seacat as Gladys
Peter Anderson as Tom
Terence Kelly as Mongo
Tom Heaton as Man with Stutter

Reception
Roger Ebert awarded the film two stars.  S. Jhoanna Robledo of Common Sense Media gave it three stars out of five.

References

External links
 
 

American drama films
Films based on British novels
The Samuel Goldwyn Company films
1980s English-language films
1980s American films